Actin-related protein 2/3 complex subunit 5 is a protein that in humans is encoded by the ARPC5 gene.

Function 

This gene encodes one of seven subunits of the human Arp2/3 protein complex. The Arp2/3 protein complex has been implicated in the control of actin polymerization in cells and has been conserved through evolution. The exact role of the protein encoded by this gene, the p16 subunit, has yet to be determined.

Interactions 

ARPC5 has been shown to interact with ARPC4.

References

Further reading

External links